Glyptotrox frontera is a beetle in the family Trogidae.

References

Glyptotrox
Beetles described in 1955